Priyavrat Singh (born 5 December 1977) is an Indian politician who is a member of the Indian National Congress, and the Member of the Legislative Assembly (MLA) of Madhya Pradhesh,
He was elected first time in 2003 and was re-elected in 2008. 
He lost the 2013 election, but was re-elected in 2018, He represented the constituency of Khilchipur Vidhan Sabha and was a cabinet minister (in the Energy Department) of the Madhya Pradesh government from 2018 to 2020. 

He is also known as Raja (Darbar) of Khilchipur.
He lived in a fort (Rajmahal) of khilchipur.
He is very popular in his constituency.

Political career
He was elected for the record third time as an MLA from Khilchipur Assembly constituency in 2018, and was made cabinet minister of energy in the Kamal Nath ministry of the Madhya Pradesh Congress government, between December 2018 and March 2020. 

He became Jila Panchayat Sadasya (in very young age of 21 years) from Rajgarh district from 1998 to 2003,

Based on his popularity in Khilchipur Assembly constituency, he was given ticket for MLA in 2003 from Congress Party, he won it with huge margin and became MLA (first time) from Khilchipur constituency. He became very popular face in the Khilchipur Assembly constituency due to his work in his constituency.
 
He was reelected in 2008 (2nd time) from Khilchipur constituency as MLA.

In 2013 he was again given ticket from Khilchipur Assembly constituency but he lost this election to Kunwar Hajarilal Dangi of BJP, but he kept serving his constituency people.

In 2018 he again fight assembly election on Congress ticket and won it with huge margin and became MLA (third time) from Khilchipur Assembly constituency, and became energy minister of cabinet rank in Kamalnath government.

His name had been announced as the national president of the Indian Youth Congress, but the Congress leader, Rahul Gandhi, noted controversial remark in Bihar immediately he came to Mumbai and named Rajeev Satav as a national president of Indian Youth Congress.

References

Indian National Congress politicians from Madhya Pradesh
Living people
People from Indore
Madhya Pradesh MLAs 2008–2013
1977 births
Madhya Pradesh MLAs 2018–2023